WTSO (1070 kHz, "1070 The Game") is a commercial AM radio station in Madison, Wisconsin.  The station is owned and operated by iHeartMedia, Inc., and airs a sports format.  From 2014 until February 1, 2020, WTSO was simulcast on FM translator W265CV at 100.9 MHz. W265CV now airs a 1960s-1970s oldies format as "U-100.9".

WTSO's offices and studios are on South Fish Hatchery Road in Fitchburg (but using Madison as its mailing address).  The transmitter is off East Tower Road in McFarland.  WTSO operates at 10,000 watts by day.  But at night it reduces its power to 5,000 watts, using a directional antenna, because AM 1070 is a clear-channel frequency.  WTSO must protect Class A stations KNX Los Angeles and CBA Moncton, New Brunswick, from interference, so the nighttime signal is nulled away from the west and the east.  (CBA switched to the FM dial in 2008 but WTSO still must protect the Canadian AM station's former coverage area.)  WTSO's former FM translator operates with 250 watts from a 243-meter (798 foot) tower off South Pleasant View Road in Madison.

Programming
WTSO broadcasts local sports call-in shows during weekday morning and afternoon drive times.  "Lucas in the Morning," hosted by longtime Wisconsin Badgers radio analyst and Madison sports columnist/reporter Mike Lucas.  WTSO's schedule also features nationally syndicated sports shows hosted by Dan Patrick and Rich Eisen.  At night and on weekends, programming from Fox Sports Radio is heard. Since the start of 2013, the station's local sports shows have been simulcast on Milwaukee sister station 920 WOKY, an unusual situation where a station in a smaller media market provides the simulcast for the larger market station.

WTSO's live sports coverage includes broadcasts of Chicago Cubs baseball, NASCAR races from MRN Radio and PRN Radio, as well as local high school events, including championships in the Wisconsin Interscholastic Athletic Association.  WTSO also airs live broadcasts of certain University of Wisconsin Badgers along with sister station WIBA.

History
The station first signed on the air on January 19, 1948, as WKOW. With Wisconsin known as "The Dairy State," the original call letters stood for the word "cow." The licensee was the Monona Broadcasting Company.

In the mid-1970s, the call sign was changed to WTSO to stand for Ten Seven zerO, its frequency.  At that time it was owned by Mid-Continent Broadcasting and aired a country music format.  As country music listening switched to the FM dial, WTSO tried a talk radio format and later adult standards.

In 2000, WTSO went with its current all-sports format, originally as a network affiliate of ESPN Radio, calling itself "Madison's ESPN Radio 10-7-0."   On January 1, 2009, WTSO parted company with ESPN Radio and rebranded as "The Big 1070, Madison's Sports Station," affiliating with Fox Sports Radio and later adding programming from NBC Sports Radio.  (ESPN Radio programming now airs on 100.5 WTLX.)  On February 3, 2020, WTSO rebranded as "1070 The Game." In March 2021 WTSO announced it would become the Chicago Cubs Radio Network's first Wisconsin affiliate, providing a locally based alternate to the Chicago based WSCR which also covers Southern Wisconsin with its signal.

Previous Logos
WTSO's original logo under the "Big 1070" branding (c. 2010).

WTSO's Previous Logo used from 2010 to 2014.

WTSO's Previous Logo used from 2014 to 2020.

See also
List of radio stations in Wisconsin

References

External links
WTSO Website

FCC History Cards for WTSO

TSO
Sports radio stations in the United States
IHeartMedia radio stations
Fox Sports Radio stations